Thomas Polos (born April 17, 1988) is an American actor, humorist and writer best known for his role as Owen on the Move in a series of AT&T television commercials.

Life and career
Polos was born in Katonah, New York. He is an alumnus of the British American Drama Academy and the USC School of Dramatic Arts. While at USC, he was the basketball mascot and was elected commencement speaker for his Bachelor of Fine Arts program.

He has advocated for Camp Sunshine, a retreat for children with terminal illnesses in Casco, Maine and has participated in endurance events to raise money and awareness for the program and other charities.

He regularly appears on television and has played the role of AT&T's Owen on the Move since 2015.

Polos' works have been reported on by the New York Post, CBS Radio, TMZ.com and Time magazine.

References

Living people
1988 births
American male actors